Allan Irénée Saint-Maximin (born 12 March 1997) is a French professional footballer who plays as a winger for  club Newcastle United. He previously played for Saint-Étienne, Monaco and Nice.

Early life
Saint-Maximin was born in Châtenay-Malabry, a commune in the southwestern suburbs of Paris, and is of Guadeloupean and French Guianese descent.

Club career

Early career
Saint-Maximin made his Ligue 1 debut for Saint-Étienne on 1 September 2013, replacing Romain Hamouma after 69 minutes in a 2–1 home win against Bordeaux.

On 31 July 2015, Saint-Maximin joined Monaco, but was immediately loaned to German club Hannover 96. On 28 July 2016,  Saint-Maximin joined Bastia on a season-long loan deal.

Saint-Maximin completed a move to rival club Nice for an undisclosed transfer fee, on 7 August 2017.

Newcastle United
On 2 August 2019, Saint-Maximin joined Premier League side Newcastle United on a six-year contract. He made his debut nine days later in Newcastle's defeat to Arsenal on the opening day of the Premier League season. On 5 December, Saint-Maximin scored his first goal for the club in a 2–0 win against Sheffield United. His second goal came two months later in the fourth round of the FA Cup against League One opposition Oxford United, scoring a late winner after a solo run.

The Frenchman also scored the winning goal in Newcastle's 1–0 win at Southampton in a Premier League match on 7 March 2020. On 1 July, Saint-Maximin provided three assists in the Magpies' 4–1 win over AFC Bournemouth.

Personal life
Saint-Maximin has three children who live with him in Newcastle upon Tyne.

Career statistics

Honours
Newcastle United
EFL Cup runner-up: 2022–23

Individual
Premier League Goal of the Month: August 2022

References

External links

 
 
 
 

1997 births
Living people
People from Châtenay-Malabry
Footballers from Hauts-de-Seine
French footballers
France youth international footballers
France under-21 international footballers
Association football wingers
AC Boulogne-Billancourt players
AS Saint-Étienne players
AS Monaco FC players
Hannover 96 players
SC Bastia players
OGC Nice players
Newcastle United F.C. players
Championnat National 3 players
Championnat National 2 players
Ligue 1 players
Bundesliga players
Premier League players
French expatriate footballers
Expatriate footballers in England
Expatriate footballers in Germany
French expatriate sportspeople in England
French expatriate sportspeople in Germany
French people of Guadeloupean descent
French people of French Guianan descent
Black French sportspeople